The Community Housing Improvement Program is a trade association that represents the owners of over 4,000 apartment buildings in New York City. It was founded in 1966 by William A. Moses.

References

Trade associations based in the United States
Organizations established in 1966
Real estate industry trade groups
Real estate-related professional associations
Organizations based in New York City